Honey Claws is an American electronic, experimental, hip hop band formed in Austin, Texas in 2008. The band has released three albums and one EP, the first album self-titled Honey Claws was released in 2008. They released a second album called Money Jaws  in 2012. Their most recent album One Law was released in 2014.

Band members
Thomas Sahs
Jon Von Letscher

Former members
Ben Senior
Traey Hatch

Discography

 Healer EP (2008)
 Honey Claws (2008)
 Money Jaws (2012)
 C Sides - Single (2013)
 H Sides - Single (2013)
 One Law (2014)

In popular culture
The band became known when one of their songs, "Digital Animal", from their first record was featured in the episode "Thirty-Eight Snub" of the TV show Breaking Bad, gaining the band many fans.

References
 http://www.pigfactory.com/Placements.html

External links
 Official MySpace
 iTunes Store

American experimental musical groups
Musical groups from Austin, Texas
Musical groups established in 2008
2008 establishments in Texas